Ngora is a town in the Eastern Region of Uganda. It is the main political, administrative, and commercial centre of Ngora District.

Location

The coordinates of Ngora Town are 1°27'27.0"N, 33°46'35.0"E (Latitude:1.457500; Longitude:33.776389).

Population
The population census in 2002 put Ngora town's population at 11,333. In April 2013, local authorities estimated the population to be 20,000. In 2014, the national population census put the population at 15,086.

In 2015, UBOS estimated the population of Ngora Town to be 15,500. In 2020, the population agency estimated the mid-year population of the town at 17,700 people. Of these, 9,000 (50.8 percent) were females and 8,700 (49.2 percent) were males. UBOS calculated that the town's population increased at an average annual rate of 2.69 percent between 2015 and 2020.

Points of interest
The following additional points of interest lie within the town limits or close to its edges:

1. The offices of Ngora Town Council

2. The offices of Ngora District Administration

3. Ngora Central Market

4. Ngora Freda Carr Hospital, a 180-bed, community, missionary hospital, affiliated with the Church of Uganda.

5. Nyero Rock Paintings are ancient paintings on rock surfaces, dating back to before 1250 AD.

See also
 Teso people
 List of cities and towns in Uganda

References

Populated places in Eastern Region, Uganda
Cities in the Great Rift Valley
Ngora District
Teso sub-region